Edward Isaac was an influential 16th-century English Protestant and Marian exile. He was a lay supporter of John Bland. He resided at Well Court in Ickham and Well, Kent.

Isaac helped Edwin Sandys leave England, sending his son to accompany him to Antwerp. Mary I of England arranged for eleven of the exiles to be arrested for sedition, including Isaac. Isaac himself left for Strasburg, where he was one of the group opposed to John Knox.

References

Year of birth missing
Year of death missing
Marian exiles
English Protestants
16th-century Protestants
16th-century English people